The Pollution Prevention Act of 1990 (PPA) is a United States federal law that created a national policy to promote the prevention of pollution or reduction at pollution sources wherever possible. The law also expanded the Toxics Release Inventory (TRI), a waste reporting program administered by the United States Environmental Protection Agency (EPA).

Overview
The Pollution Prevention Act focused industry, government, and public attention on reducing the amount of pollution through cost-effective changes in production, operation, and raw materials use. Opportunities for source reduction are often not realized because many existing environmental regulations focus on waste treatment and disposal. Consequently industrial resources have been focused on compliance with the treatment and disposal requirements.

Implementation
EPA efforts to promote prevention practices include waste permitting procedures, revisions to regulations, technical assistance to industry and government agencies, and enforcement. The agency also makes efforts to link pollution prevention to public information about chemicals, such as in the TRI program.

See also
 Green chemistry
 Pollution in the United States

References

Further reading

External links
 As codified in 42 U.S.C. chapter 133 of the United States Code from the LII
 As codified in 42 U.S.C. chapter 133 of the United States Code from the US House of Representatives
 Title VI subtitle F of Omnibus Budget Reconciliation Act of 1990 (PDF/details) as amended in the GPO Statute Compilations collection
 Omnibus Budget Reconciliation Act of 1990 as enacted in the US Statutes at Large

1990 in law
1990 in the environment
United States federal environmental legislation